Gap Cathedral (French: Cathédrale Notre-Dame-et-Saint-Arnoux de Gap) is a Roman Catholic church located in the town of Gap, Hautes-Alpes, France. It is a national monument, and is the seat of the Bishop of Gap and Embrun.

The current cathedral was built between 1866 and 1905 in Neo-Gothic style by architect Charles Laisné on the site of a former mediaeval cathedral.

History

The original cathedral on the site was built around the 5th century on the ruins of a Roman temple to the God Apollo. Over the years several buildings stood at the same spot.  Forty-one different types of stone were chosen for the construction, showing Byzantine influence. Roman and Gothic styles were also chosen, as was common during this era for a sombre and harmonious feeling at the same time.

The clock tower stands at 64 meters high and contains four clocks.

Consecrated on September 2nd, 1895, the day of Saint-Arnoux, who was Bishop of Gap during the 11th century and is the patron saint of the Gap. The cathedral was classified as an Historical Monument on August 9th, 1906.

References and Notes

External links

 Location
 Pictures of the cathedral

Churches in Hautes-Alpes
Roman Catholic cathedrals in France
Roman Catholic churches completed in 1905
20th-century Roman Catholic church buildings in France